John Boutté (born November 3, 1958) is an American jazz singer based in New Orleans, Louisiana, who has been active since the mid-1990s. He is known for diverse music style that goes beyond jazz to R&B, gospel, Latin, and blues. He is the younger brother of the jazz and gospel singer Lillian Boutté, and a relative of legendary cartoonist George Herriman.

Life and career
Boutté was born into a 7th Ward Creole-Catholic family in New Orleans. Exposed to the local culture such as Mardi Gras parades and jazz funerals since childhood, Boutté also grew up listening to R&B music of Stevie Wonder, Marvin Gaye and the like. He played trumpet and cornet in marching bands in his junior high and high school days. During this time, he also formed an a cappella group and sang on the streets.

Boutté studied business at Xavier University of Louisiana where he was in ROTC. After he graduated, he was commissioned in the U.S. Army  where he served for the next four years. When he returned, he started to work for a credit union instead of entering into the music industry. When he met Stevie Wonder, he started to seriously consider becoming a professional singer. Wonder acknowledged his talent and recommended him to pursue career in music. He soon joined Lillian on her tour to Europe, and his professional career started.

He was featured on Lillian's live album, Gospel United, released in 1994. In 1993, he released an album under his own name titled Through the Eyes of a Child.

He was the featured guest vocalist on Cuban group Cubanismo!'s Mardi Gras Mambo, recorded in New Orleans.

In the recent years, Boutté has been working with ex-Cowboy Mouth guitarist and singer, Paul Sanchez which led to a collaborated effort Stew Called New Orleans released in 2009. Boutté was also featured on John Scofield's 2009 album, Piety Street, singing the lead on three tracks.

Singers Tricia Boutté (Sister Teedy) and Tanya E. Boutté are John's nieces.

Boutté's "Treme Song" on his Jambalaya album is the theme song of HBO's series, Treme. Boutté appears in Treme's Season 1 Finale, serenading Kim Dickens' character before she leaves New Orleans; Season 2, episode 1, performing several songs (including "Accentuate the Positive"); and sings onstage in Treme Season 3, episode 10.

Discography

Albums
 1993: Through the Eyes of a Child (Dinosaur)
 1997: Scotch and Soda ( Boutteworks johnboutte.com)
 1998: Friends
 2001: At the Foot of Canal Street (Boutteworks johnboutte.com)
 2003: John Boutté & Uptown Okra / Carry Me Home (Boutteworks johnboutte.com))
 2003:  Jambalaya (Boutteworks johnboutte.com)
 2007: John Boutté and Conspirare'(Boutteworks johnboutte.com)
 2008: Good Neighbor (Boutteworks johboutte.com)
 2009: John Boutté and Paul Sanchez / Stew Called New Orleans (Threadhead)
 2012:  All About Everything (Boutteworks johnboutte.com)
 2019:  A "Well Tempered" Boutté (Boutteworks johnboutte.com)

Guest appearances
 1994: Lillian Boutté with Gospel United / Live at Odense Koncerthus (Gospel United Production)
 2000: Cubanismo / Mardi Gras Mambo (Rykodisc)
 2002: Doc Houlind Ragtime Band meets John Boutte / Live At FEMO (Music Mecca)
 2008: Paul Sanchez / Exit to Mystery Street (Threadhead)
 2009: Glen David Andrews / Walking Through Heaven's Gate (Threadhead)
 2009: John Scofield / Piety Street (Universal Classics)
 2009: Tom McDermott / New Orleans Duets (Rabadash)
 2009: Doug Cox & Salil Bhatt / Slide To Freedom 2 (NorthernBlues Music)
 2010: Galactic / YA-KA-MAY 2016: John was the charity singer in the movie When the Bough Breaks 2017: Todd Rundgren /  Beginning(Of the End)'' / (Cleopatra Records)

References

External links

 John Boutte, New Orleans Jazz Vocalist (Official site)
 [ Biography on Allmusic]
 John Boutté John Boutté MusiCodex Page

20th-century African-American male singers
American blues singers
American jazz singers
21st-century African-American male singers
American rhythm and blues singers
Louisiana Creole people
Jazz musicians from New Orleans
Rhythm and blues musicians from New Orleans
Living people
1958 births
Singers from Louisiana
American male jazz musicians